Alberta Provincial Highway No. 59, commonly referred to as Highway 59, is an east–west highway in northwest Alberta, Canada.  It runs from Highway 2 north of Sexsmith to Highway 43 northwest of Hythe.

Major intersections 
From west to east.

References 

059